The Reserve Infantry Division of Yantai() was a reserve infantry formation of the People's Liberation Army.

The formation of the Reserve Division of Yantai() started in March 1984, at Yantai, Shandong. The division was formally activated on June 14, 1984. The division was composed of 3 infantry regiments and 1 artillery regiment. In November 1985 the division was redesignated as the Reserve Infantry Division of Yantai.

The division was then composed of:
1st Infantry Regiment - Zhaoyuan
2nd Infantry Regiment - Muping
3rd Infantry Regiment
Artillery Regiment

In October 1998 the division merged with the 76th Infantry Division as the 76th Reserve Infantry Division of Shandong.

References

Reserve divisions of the People's Liberation Army
Military units and formations established in 1984